Zorqabad Rural District is a rural district (dehestan) in the Central District of Esfarayen County, North Khorasan Province, Iran. At the 2006 census, its population was 6,831, in 1,686 families.  The rural district has 27 villages.

References 

Rural Districts of North Khorasan Province
Esfarayen County